The canton of Alès-1 is an administrative division of the Gard department, southern France. It was created at the French canton reorganisation which came into effect in March 2015. Its seat is in Alès.

It consists of the following communes:
 
Alès (partly)
Anduze
Bagard
Boisset-et-Gaujac
Générargues
Ribaute-les-Tavernes
Saint-Christol-lès-Alès
Saint-Jean-du-Pin

References

Cantons of Gard